Machaeraptenus yepezi is a moth of the family Erebidae first described by Hervé de Toulgoët in 1984. It is found in Venezuela.

References

Phaegopterina
Moths described in 1984